Progress in Brain Research is a series of academic books on neuroscience published by Elsevier. The editors-in-chief of the series are Stephen Waxman (Yale University School of Medicine), Donald G. Stein (Emory University), Dick Swaab (Netherlands Institute for Neuroscience), Howard Fields (University of California). Despite being a book series, Progress in Brain Research is abstracted and indexed in the Science Citation Index and according to the Journal Citation Reports, the series has a 2012 impact factor of 4.191. Each volume has its own International Standard Book Number (ISBN). In addition, the series has an International Standard Serial Number (print: ,). The series is also abstracted and indexed in Index Medicus/MEDLINE/PubMed.

References

External links 
 
 Online access

Neuroscience journals
Elsevier academic journals
Publications established in 1963
English-language journals